Edwardes is a surname.

Edwardes may also refer to:

Edwardes baronets, an extinct title in the Baronetage of England
Edwardes College, Peshawar, Pakistan
Edwardes Lake, in Reservoir, Victoria, Australia, a suburb of Melbourne